Ian Armstrong Muller (born 23 July 1965) is a former Australian rules footballer who played with Carlton and St Kilda in the Australian Football League (AFL).

Notes

External links 

Ian Muller's profile on Blueseum

1965 births
Living people
VFL/AFL players born outside Australia
Carlton Football Club players
St Kilda Football Club players
Maffra Football Club players
People educated at Scotch College, Melbourne
Australian rules footballers from Victoria (Australia)
South African emigrants to Australia